Aruvikkuzhy Falls (not to be confused with Aruvikkuzhi Waterfalls) is a waterfall about  high located about 2km from Thadiyoor and 7km from Kozhencherry  in the Pathanamthitta district, Kerala, India. It is now becoming a popular tourist destination. 

The word Aruvikkuzhy means "a water stream with depth" in the Malayalam language (aruvi=water stream, kuzhy=deep hole).

References

Waterfalls of Kerala
Geography of Pathanamthitta district